The Restless Supermarket is a novel by Croatian-South African author Ivan Vladislavic, which tracks the changes in Hillbrow, Johannesburg, during the 1990s, through the eyes of a grumpy, retired proof-reader who spends his life in one café. It was published by David Philip Publishers in Cape Town in 2001 and was recently reissued. The book was published again in 2014 by publishing house 'And Other Stories.'

2001 novels
21st-century South African novels
Novels set in Johannesburg